The men's 1500 metres race of the 2014–15 ISU Speed Skating World Cup 5, arranged in the Vikingskipet arena in Hamar, Norway, was held on 1 February 2015.

Denis Yuskov of Russia won, followed by Kjeld Nuis of the Netherlands in second place, and Denny Morrison of Canada in third place. Danil Sinitsyn of Russia won Division B.

Results
The race took place on Saturday, 1 February, with Division B scheduled in the morning session, at 10:40, and Division A scheduled in the afternoon session, at 14:19.

Division A

Division B

References

Men 1500
5